Dichagyris sureyae is a moth of the family Noctuidae. It is found in Turkey, south-western Iran and Israel.

Adults are on wing in October. There is one generation per year.

The larvae feed at night on low growing plants.

External links
 Noctuinae of Israel

sureyae
Moths of the Middle East
Moths described in 1938